Temple Gurdon may refer to:

 Edward Temple Gurdon (1854–1929), British rugby player
 Temple Gurdon (British Army officer) (1896–1959), British General